{{Hatnote|For another tree called pōhutukawa see Metrosideros excelsa}}Metrosideros kermadecensis, with common names Kermadec pōhutukawa and New Zealand Christmas bush is an evergreen tree of the myrtle family which is endemic to the volcanic Kermadec Islands about 900 km north-east of New Zealand. The tree produces a brilliant display of red flowers, made up of a mass of stamens and is the dominant forest tree on Raoul Island, growing to 15 m or more.  The trunk is up to 1 m or more in diameter. It is very similar to, and often confused with, the pōhutukawa of mainland New Zealand, differing mainly by having smaller, more oval leaves, and by flowering throughout the year. It  also resembles the ōhia lehua of Hawaii.

Conservation
Because it is endemic to a small group of islands,  Metrosideros kermadecensis is listed as range restricted, but is not regarded as threatened.

CultivationMetrosideros kermadecensis is widely cultivated in New Zealand and has naturalised in Hawaii.  A variegated form is widely planted in home gardens. Propagation is easy from fresh seed. Cuttings may be grown from water shoots. It hybridises with pōhutukawa (M. excelsa).

See also
Pōhutukawa

References

 
 
 Simpson, P., 2005. Pōhutukawa & Rātā: New Zealand's Iron-Hearted Trees''. Wellington: Te Papa Press.

External links

kermadecensis
Flora of the Kermadec Islands
Endemic flora of New Zealand
Trees of New Zealand